The 1872 United States House of Representatives elections in South Carolina were held on November 5, 1872 to select five Representatives for two-year terms from the state of South Carolina.  The three incumbents who ran were re-elected and the two open seats were retained by the Republicans.  The composition of the state delegation thus remained solely Republican.

1st congressional district
Incumbent Republican Congressman Joseph Rainey of the 1st congressional district, in office since 1870, was unopposed in his bid for re-election.

General election results

|-
| 
| colspan=5 |Republican hold
|-

2nd congressional district
Incumbent Republican Congressman Robert C. De Large of the 2nd congressional district, in office since 1871, declined to run for re-election.  Alonzo J. Ransier was nominated by the Republicans and defeated Independent Republican challenger William Gurney in the general election.

General election results

|-
| bgcolor="#ff00ff" |
| Independent Republican
| William Gurney
| align="right" | 6,549
| align="right" | 24.6
| align="right" | +24.6
|-

|-
| 
| colspan=5 |Republican hold
|-

3rd congressional district
Incumbent Republican Congressman Robert B. Elliott of the 3rd congressional district, in office since 1871, defeated two Democratic candidates in the general election.

General election results

|-
| 
| colspan=5 |Republican hold
|-

4th congressional district
Incumbent Republican Congressman Alexander S. Wallace of the 4th congressional district, in office since 1870, defeated Democratic challenger Benjamin Franklin Perry.

General election results

|-
| 
| colspan=5 |Republican hold
|-

At-large district
The state unsuccessfully applied to have a fifth member seated in 1871 in the House of Representatives.  Following apportionment from the 1870 census, the state was granted an extra seat and an At-large election was used to decide the fifth member.  Republican Richard H. Cain defeated Independent Republican L.E. Johnson in the election and became the only member from South Carolina to be elected from an At-large district.

General election results

|-
| bgcolor="#ff00ff" |
| Independent Republican
| Lewis E. Johnson
| align="right" | 26,394
| align="right" | 26.6
| align="right" | +26.6
|-

|-
| 
| colspan=5 |Republican gain
|-

See also
United States House of Representatives elections, 1872
South Carolina gubernatorial election, 1872
South Carolina's congressional districts

References
"Report of the Secretary of State to the General Assembly of South Carolina." Reports and Resolutions of the General Assembly of the State of South Carolina at the Regular Session, 1871-'72. Columbia, SC: Republican Printing Company, 1872, pp. 62, 64-67.

1872
United States House of Representatives
South Carolina